In the 2015–16 season, JS Saoura competed in the Ligue 1 for the 4th season, as well as the Algerian Cup. in August 2015, Mustapha Kouici was dismissed from his position, and the team's spokesman Mohamed Zerouati said that the new president of the club was the one who took this decision and the contract signed between the two sides allows that.

Squad list
Players and squad numbers last updated on 14 August 2015.Note: Flags indicate national team as has been defined under FIFA eligibility rules. Players may hold more than one non-FIFA nationality.

Competitions

Overview

Ligue 1

League table

Results summary

Results by round

Matches

Algerian Cup

Squad information

Playing statistics

|-
! colspan=14 style=background:#dcdcdc; text-align:center| Goalkeepers

|-
! colspan=14 style=background:#dcdcdc; text-align:center| Defenders

|-
! colspan=14 style=background:#dcdcdc; text-align:center| Midfielders

|-
! colspan=14 style=background:#dcdcdc; text-align:center| Forwards

|-
! colspan=14 style=background:#dcdcdc; text-align:center| Players transferred out during the season

Goalscorers

Transfers

In

Out

References

JS Saoura seasons
Algerian football clubs 2015–16 season